The Lotus 72 is a Formula One car designed by Colin Chapman and Maurice Philippe of Lotus for the 1970 Formula One season. The 72 was a pioneering design featuring inboard brakes, side-mounted radiators in sidepods (as opposed to the nose-mounted radiators, which had been commonplace since before World War II), and aerodynamic wings producing down-force.

Development 

The overall shape of the 72 was innovative, resembling a wedge on wheels which was inspired by the earlier Lotus 56 gas turbine car. The shape made for better air penetration and higher speeds. In a back-to-back test with the Lotus 49, the 72 was 12 mph faster with the same Cosworth engine.

Chapman's and Phillippe's efforts produced one of the most remarkable and successful designs in F1 history. Taking the stressed engine layout technique from the Lotus 49 and adding advanced aerodynamics produced a car that was years ahead of its rivals. To begin with, however, problems with the handling of the car had to be overcome, due to a lack of 'feel' caused by the anti-dive suspension geometry – which was designed to prevent the nose of the car dipping significantly under braking – and the anti-squat set-up at the rear, which was supposed to stop the car 'squatting down' under acceleration. Once the suspension was modified, there were no further major problems aside from front inboard brake shafts failing. The car caused a sensation amongst the media and fans, with many people clamouring to see the remarkable car in action.

A total of nine chassis were built.

Race history

1970

The car was introduced at Spanish Grand Prix in April, 2nd race of the 1970 season, driven by Jochen Rindt and John Miles. 72 was withdrawn from competition after Spanish Grand Prix, due to poor performance, for suspension modification, was re-entered for Dutch GP. Rindt made the car successful, winning the Dutch, French, British and German Grands Prix in quick succession. Rindt was almost certainly going to win the world championship but was killed in a qualifying crash at Monza, driving the 72 with its wings removed, when a front brake shaft failed sending the car at high speed into a poorly installed safety barrier. His replacement, Emerson Fittipaldi, won the United States race, helping Rindt become F1's only posthumous world champion. Rindt's and Fittipaldi's combined points for the season helped Lotus to its fourth constructors' championship.

1971–1972

The car was developed during 1971 by Tony Rudd who had formerly worked at BRM. He worked especially on redesigning the rear suspension and modified the rear wing to produce more downforce. Fittipaldi struggled during the season but scored good results and finished a respectable sixth, whilst the following season was much better. The development work done behind the scenes helped him become the youngest world champion in F1's history in 1972 winning five races in the 72, whilst Lotus again won the constructors' championship. The car now sported a striking paintscheme of black and gold; Imperial Tobacco had introduced a new brand, and decided to increase exposure and provide more funds to Lotus as part of the deal. Lotus was now sponsored by John Player Special cigarettes.

1973
The 1973 season saw new rules introduced to increase car safety. This included mandatory deformable structure to be built into the sides of the cars, causing the 72 to be further updated with integrated sidepods, larger bodywork and new wing mounts. Fittipaldi was joined for 1973 by Swede Ronnie Peterson. Peterson fell in love with the 72. In his first season with Lotus, Peterson won four races, while Fittipaldi won three, but a number of retirements helped Jackie Stewart snatch the drivers' championship, although the large points tally built up by their two drivers helped Lotus keep the constructors' championship. Fittipaldi left for McLaren in 1974, to drive a car closely based on the 72, the McLaren M23.

1974
This left Peterson as team leader, while Jacky Ickx joined the team to partner him. The 72 was meant to be replaced by the Lotus 76, intended to be a lighter and leaner version of the 72, but the car's technology proved to be too ambitious and the project flopped. Lotus turned to the venerable 72 for the 1974 season. A further update to the car, increasing the front and rear track kept the car competitive. Peterson won another three races and challenged for the championship in a very closely contested season, ably supported by Ickx who turned in solid performances and scored several podiums. The now aging 72 did remarkably well for a four-year-old design, finishing fourth in the constructors' championship.

1975

For 1975, without a replacement chassis, the 72 was again pressed into service. By now it was obvious that the car, even with further modifications including a wider track and redesigned suspension, was no match for the new Ferrari 312T, which took the title, or even the latest Brabham BT44 and Lotus finished 6th in the constructors' championship.

After 20 wins, two drivers' and three constructors' championships, the 72 was retired for the 1976 season and replaced by the Lotus 77. This longevity makes it one of the most successful ever Formula 1 cars.

Historic Formula One Championship
The car was later used to win the 1996 Historic Formula One Championship.

Complete Formula One World Championship results
(key) (results in bold indicate pole position; results in italics indicate fastest lap)

 Includes 14 points scored using the Lotus 49. Includes 3 points scored using the Lotus 76.

Non-championship Formula One results

(key)

References

72
1970 Formula One season cars
1971 Formula One season cars
1972 Formula One season cars
1973 Formula One season cars
1974 Formula One season cars
1975 Formula One season cars
Formula One championship-winning cars